Merry Anders (born Mary Helen Anderson; May 22, 1934 – October 28, 2012) was an American actress and model who appeared in a number of television programs and films from the 1950s until her retirement from the screen in 1972.

Early life
Anders was born in Chicago in 1934, the only child of Charles, a contractor, and Helen Anderson. Anders was of German, Irish and Swedish descent. In 1949, Anders and her mother visited Los Angeles for two weeks. They decided to remain in Los Angeles permanently while Charles Anderson remained in Chicago. While she was a student at John Burroughs Middle School, Anders met former actress Rita Leroy who encouraged her to begin a modeling career. While working as a junior model, Anders began studying acting at the Ben Bard Playhouse. It was there that a talent scout from 20th Century Fox spotted her and signed her to a film contract in 1951.

Career
Anders made her film debut in the 1951 musical Golden Girl. For the next two years, she appeared in small and supporting roles in several 20th Century Fox films. In 1954, Fox dropped her. Later that year, Anders joined the cast of The Stu Erwin Show. She remained with the series until its cancellation in 1955. Anders was then cast in the CBS sitcom It's Always Jan, starring Janis Paige. That series was canceled after one season.

Shortly after the birth of her daughter in 1956, Anders took over the role of "Rita Malone" (popularized by Jayne Mansfield) in the West Coast touring production of the Broadway hit Will Success Spoil Rock Hunter?. In 1957, Anders had a much-publicized leading role in Paramount Pictures film Hear Me Good, opposite Hal March. She starred in four low-budget films that same year, The Dalton Girls, Calypso Heat Wave, The Night Runner and Escape from San Quentin.

Also in 1957, Anders landed the role of Mike McCall in the NTA Film Network and syndicated sitcom How to Marry a Millionaire. The series was based on the hit 1953 film of the same name (in which Anders appeared in a bit role) starring Betty Grable, Marilyn Monroe, and Lauren Bacall. Anders co-starred in the series with Barbara Eden and Lori Nelson. The first season of How to Marry a Millionaire was fairly successful and it was renewed for a second, abbreviated season. It was cancelled in 1959.

During the early to mid 1960s, Anders continued her career with mainly supporting film roles and guest spots on television. In 1960, she appeared in the horror film The Hypnotic Eye followed by a role in the Western Young Jesse James. Anders went on to land guest roles on Surfside 6, Alfred Hitchcock Presents, Hawaiian Eye, Death Valley Days, 77 Sunset Strip, and Perry Mason. In 1962 Anders appeared as Ruth Graham/Fay Pierce on Cheyenne in the episode titled "The Long Rope." She also appeared on The Addams Family as a cosmetics salesperson ("Fester's Punctured Romance").

In 1962, Anders was cast in the first English-language live action film adaptation of the 18th century French fairy tale Beauty and the Beast. In 1965, she appeared opposite Elvis Presley in the musical comedy Tickle Me.
The following year, she appeared in the recurring role of "Alice" in the teen soap opera Never Too Young. Later that year, Anders had a supporting role in the B movie Women of the Prehistoric Planet. 

From 1967 to 1968, she appeared in seven episodes of Jack Webb's Dragnet series on NBC, in which she played policewoman Dorothy Miller. She appeared in a recurring role on Lassie.

Retirement and later years
By the late 1960s, Anders' acting career had begun to wane. In 1968, she appeared as uncredited "glorified extra" in the film Airport (1970). To supplement her income between acting jobs, Anders took a job as a receptionist at Litton Industries. Her final acting role was a guest spot in the two part Gunsmoke episode "Waste", which aired late September and early October 1971.

Anders retired from acting in 1972 in order to "live a normal life." She eventually became a customer relations coordinator at Litton Industries, where she remained until her retirement in 1994.

Personal life
On March 25, 1955, Anders married producer John Stephens. They separated on July 12, 1955, due to his physical abuse. Two weeks later, she discovered she was pregnant with the couple's first child. Their daughter, Tina Beth Paige Anders, was born in March 1956. Anders and Stephens were divorced in June 1956. In 1986, Anders married engineer Richard Benedict; the couple remained married until his death in 1999.

Death
On October 28, 2012, Anders died in Encino, California, aged 78, from undisclosed causes.

Filmography

References

External links

 

1934 births
2012 deaths
20th-century American actresses
20th Century Studios contract players
Actresses from Greater Los Angeles
Actresses from Chicago
American child models
Female models from Illinois
American film actresses
American people of German descent
American people of Irish descent
American people of Swedish descent
American television actresses
American stage actresses
Western (genre) film actresses
Western (genre) television actors
Models from Chicago